Tillmann is a surname and given name of German and Danish origin. Variants of the name include Tilman, Tillman, and Dillman. Notable people with the name Tillmann include:

Surname 
 Antje Tillmann (born 1964), German politician
 Fritz Tillmann (1910–1986), German actor
 Jean-Jacques Tillmann (1935–2015), Swiss news reporter
 John Tillmann (1961–2018), Canadian art thief
 Sean Tillmann (born 1978), singer better known as Har Mar Superstar
 Timothy Tillman (born 1999), German-American professional soccer-player
 Ulrike Tillmann (born 1962), German-born mathematician

Given name 
 Tillmann Grove (born 1988), German soccer-player
 Tillmann Lohse ( 2003–2017), German author, editor, academic, and scholar of Medieval History
 Tillmann Uhrmacher  (1967–2011), German DJ

See also 
 
 
 Tillman, surname and given name
 Tilmann, given name

References 

Danish-language surnames
German-language surnames